The Minto Metropole is a 32-story residential building in the Westboro neighbourhood of Ottawa, Ontario. At , it is the third-tallest building in Ottawa, after Claridge Icon and Place de Ville Tower C. It is the second-tallest residential building in the National Capital Region.

The Minto Metropole is located on the near western side of the city on Island Park Drive, overlooking the Ottawa River, and within walking distance of Westboro Station. Opened in 2004, the postmodern tower is home to 153 condominiums. Originally, Minto planned to build a series of shorter towers along the waterfront, but residents complained that such a project would completely obscure their view of the river. As a result, Minto proposed building a single tall but slim tower, and city council approved the necessary rezoning.

See also

List of tallest buildings in Ottawa-Gatineau

References

External links
Official site
Emporis.com

Skyscrapers in Ottawa 
Residential skyscrapers in Canada
Residential condominiums in Canada
Postmodern architecture in Canada